Parsian County (formerly Gavbandi County) is in Hormozgan province, Iran. The capital of the county is the city of Parsian. At the 2006 census, the county's population was 37,369 in 7,972 households. (The name of the county and its capital was changed from Gavbandi to Parsian in 2007.) The following census in 2011 counted 42,843 people in 10,331 households. At the 2016 census, the county's population was 50,596 in 13,816 households.

Geographic changes
Iranian Parliament has enacted a new law to separate Gavbandi County from Hormozgan Province and add to Fars Province. Joining Fars province will bring prosperity to this region. Recently, there have been some protests going on against this new law in Hormozgan province, since the new law will cut the direct access of Hormozgan to gas rich fields and industrial regions in nearby Bushehr province.

Administrative divisions

The population history and structural changes of Parsian County's administrative divisions over three consecutive censuses are shown in the following table. The latest census shows two districts, four rural districts, and three cities.

References

 

Counties of Hormozgan Province